Augustin Farah (4 May 1910 in Kara, Lebanon – 31 March 1983) was an archbishop of the Melkite Greek Catholic Archeparchy of Tripoli and the Melkite Greek Catholic Archeparchy of Zahle and Forzol.

Ecclesiastical career

On September 8, 1937, he became an ordained priest. Farah was named on March 7, 1961, for the Archeparchy of Tripoli and was ordained bishop on June 18, 1961. The ordination was headed by the Patriarch of Antioch Maximos IV Sayegh, SMSP, at his co-consecrators were the Archbishops Philippe Nabaa of Beirut and Byblos and Athanase Ach-Chaer, BC, of Banyas. When the Diocese of Tripoli was elevated to the Archdiocese, Farah also received on 18 November 1964 the title of archbishop. From 1962 to 1965 he was a participant at all meetings of the Second Vatican Council. In 1965, Farah was shortly Apostolic Administrator of Jerusalem. On August 25, 1977, he was appointed Jean Bassoul's successor at the Melkite Greek Catholic Archeparchy of Zahle and Forzol and ran it until his death on March 31, 1983. He was succeeded by André Haddad, BS.

References

External links
 http://www.catholic-hierarchy.org/bishop/bfarah.html
 Photography

1910 births
1983 deaths
Lebanese Melkite Greek Catholics
Melkite Greek Catholic bishops